Park Island Transport Company Limited (PITCL) is a non-franchised bus company in Hong Kong. Established in 2002, it operates bus and ferry services between Ma Wan Island and other parts of Hong Kong territory. It is now a wholly-owned subsidiary of Sun Hung Kai Properties, the conglomerate which developed the major private housing estate Park Island on Ma Wan island.

History
PITCL was established in 2002 as a joint venture between Hong Kong & Kowloon Ferry and Transport International (then known as Kowloon Motor Bus Holdings). In 2009, the business was purchased by Sun Hung Kai Properties.

Bus

Routes
PITCL currently operates four bus routes:
NR330: Ma Wan (Park Island) ⇔ Tsing Yi station (with NR330A during the peak hours and operated by Sun Bus)
NR332: Ma Wan (Park Island) ⇔ Kwai Fong (between Metroplaza and Kwai Tsing Theatre, near Kwai Fong station)
NR334: Ma Wan (Park Island) ⇔ Hong Kong International Airport Terminal 1 & 2 via Cathay Pacific City
NR338: Ma Wan (Park Island) ⇔ Central Piers (ferry replacement service, overnight route)

Previous routes
The following routes were handed over to Sun Bus on 15 December 2019
NR331: Ma Wan (Pak Yan Road) ⇔ Tsuen Wan station
NR331S: Ma Wan (Pak Yan Road) ⇔ Tsuen Wan West station and Nina Tower via Tai Ho Road Flyover

Fleet
PITCL commenced with six-second-hand Dennis Dart SLFs transferred from Kowloon Motor Bus. Between 2003 and 2008, due to the rapid growth of residents in Park Island, the company bought new Dennis Dart SPDs and the very first DesignLine Olymbus electronic-motivated HEV bus from New Zealand. The three DesignLine buses were withdrawn in 2008/2010.

List of current PITCL buses fleet:
 5 Dennis Super Pointer Dart (3 of them with Luggage racks)
 1 Toyota Coaster
 8 Young Man JNP6122G
 2 MAN NL323F
 9 Alexander Dennis Enviro200
 3 Sunlong Coaches

Ferry

PITCL operates a fleet of six high-speed double-deck air-conditioned catamarans. The ferry routes are from Ma Wan to Central Piers (Pier 2), and to Tsuen Wan pier, near Tsuen Wan West station.

Fleet

See also
Transport in Hong Kong

References

External links

Guy Photo Collections

Bus companies of Hong Kong
Ferry transport in Hong Kong
Kowloon Motor Bus
Ma Wan
Sun Hung Kai Properties
Transport companies established in 2002
2002 establishments in Hong Kong
Shipping companies of Hong Kong